Eugene Harold Robinson (born March 12, 1954) is an American newspaper columnist and an associate editor of The Washington Post. His columns are syndicated to 262 newspapers by The Washington Post Writers Group. He won a Pulitzer Prize in 2009, was elected to the Pulitzer Prize Board in 2011 and served as its chair from 2017 to 2018.

Robinson also serves as NBC News and MSNBC's chief political analyst.

Robinson is a member of the National Association of Black Journalists and a board member of the IWMF (International Women's Media Foundation).

Biography

Early years and education
Robinson was born in Orangeburg, South Carolina and attended Orangeburg-Wilkinson High School, where he "was one of a handful of black students on a previously all-white campus."

Before graduating from the University of Michigan in 1974, he was the first African American co-editor-in-chief of The Michigan Daily. During the 1987–88 academic year, he was a mid-career Nieman Fellow at Harvard University.

Career
In 1976, he began his journalism career at the San Francisco Chronicle; his early assignments included the trial of publishing heiress Patty Hearst. He joined The Washington Post in 1980. Working his way up through the ranks, he was first a city hall reporter at the paper. He then became the assistant city editor; a South America correspondent based in Buenos Aires, Argentina; London bureau chief; foreign editor; and, most recently, the assistant managing editor of the paper's Style section. He began writing columns for the opinion page of the paper in 2005, also writes a twice-a-week column on politics and culture, and conducts a weekly online conversation with readers.

Robinson appears frequently as a liberal political analyst on MSNBC cable-TV network's programs such as Morning Joe, PoliticsNation with Al Sharpton, The Rachel Maddow Show, The 11th Hour with Brian Williams, and Andrea Mitchell Reports. In addition, he is often a panelist on NBC's public affairs program Meet the Press.

Robinson was awarded the 2009 Pulitzer Prize for Commentary in recognition of his columns that focused on then-Senator Barack Obama in the context of his first presidential campaign.

Robinson is a 2021 honoree of the Larry Foster Award for Integrity in Public Communication, a recognition from The Arthur W. Page Center for Integrity in Public Communication. He is a part of the fifth class of Larry Foster Award honorees, which honors professionals who "exemplify the importance of truthful communication with the public."

In March 2022, Robinson was interviewed for the Frontline documentary Putin's Road to War'', where he discussed the Russian invasion of Ukraine.

Books

References

Further reading
 Rhondda R. Thomas & Susanna Ashton, eds. (2014). The South Carolina Roots of African American Thought. Columbia: University of South Carolina Press. "Eugene Robinson (b. 1955)," p. 345-347.

External links
 Biography at The Washington Post News Service & Syndicate
 The Washington Post columns archive
 

1954 births
Living people
People from Orangeburg, South Carolina
African-American journalists
African-American writers
American columnists
American male journalists
American political writers
Journalists from South Carolina
Pulitzer Prize for Commentary winners
People from Arlington County, Virginia
University of Michigan alumni
The Washington Post people
San Francisco Chronicle people
Journalists from Virginia
NBC News people
MSNBC people
The Michigan Daily alumni
Nieman Fellows
Orangeburg-Wilkinson High School alumni